Songaksan may refer to:

 Songaksan (North Hwanghae) Kaesong
 Songaksan (Jeju) Seogwipo